Mutya ng Pilipinas 2002, the 34th edition of Mutya ng Pilipinas, Inc., was held on June 8, 2002 with Miriam Chui proclaimed as the winner of Mutya ng Pilipinas Asia Pacific who bested 23 other candidates.

Results
Color keys

Special Awards

Contestants

Crossovers from Major National Pageants prior to this date
 Mutya #13 Katherine Aban was Binibining Pilipinas 2002 Top 12 semifinalist

Post-Pageant Notes
 Mutya ng Pilipinas Asia Pacific, Miriam Chui competed at Miss Asia Pacific 2002 in Manila and placed 3rd runner-up. 
 Mutya 1st runner-up, Kristine Caballero did not compete at Miss Intercontinental 2002 pageant
 Mutya 2nd runner-up, Frances Margaret Arreza competed at Miss Tourism International 2002-2003 in Malaysia and was Top 10 semifinalist

References

External links
 Official Mutya ng Pilipinas website
  Mutya ng Pilipinas 2012 is on!

2002 beauty pageants
2002 in the Philippines
2002